This is a list of notable South Korean idol groups that debuted in the 1990s. Only groups with article are listed here.

1992 

Seo Taiji and Boys

1993 

Deux

1994 

Cool
Roo'ra
Two Two

1995 

R.ef
Turbo

1996 

Goofy
H.O.T.
Uptown

1997 

Baby V.O.X.
Diva
Jaurim
Jinusean
NRG
Sechs Kies
S.E.S.
U-BeS

1998 

1TYM
4Men
Fin.K.L
Koyote
S#arp
Shinhwa

1999 

As One
Cleo
Click-B
Fly to the Sky
g.o.d
T.T.MA

See also
 List of South Korean idol groups (2000s)
 List of South Korean idol groups (2010s)
 List of South Korean idol groups (2020s)

References

Lists of South Korean bands
 
1990s in South Korean music